Ivan Mihaylov (born 30 September 1998) is a Bulgarian former professional footballer who most recently played as a midfielder for SFC Etar Veliko Tarnovo. 

As a teenager, Ivan Mihaylov played in the best Bulgarian football teams and was a junior national player. A shoulder injury after a disco fight ended his professional career.

References

External links

1998 births
Living people
Bulgarian footballers
PFC Nesebar players
FC Chernomorets Balchik players
SFC Etar Veliko Tarnovo players
First Professional Football League (Bulgaria) players
Second Professional Football League (Bulgaria) players
Association football midfielders